Copelatus simoni is a species of diving beetle. It is part of the subfamily Copelatinae in the family Dytiscidae. It was described by Maurice Auguste Régimbart in 1889.

References

simoni
Beetles described in 1889